Like Rays is an album by American jazz guitarist Joe Morris with reedist Ken Vandermark, who played clarinet and bass clarinet, and German pianist Hans Poppel. It was recorded in 1996 and released on the Knitting Factory label.

Reception

The Penguin Guide to Jazz notes that "Vandermark is a very impressive player, with a wide range of sonorities on his clarinets. Some of this pieces are dominates by him, to a degree that suggest the alphabetical listing of performers is no more than that and that this could usefully be reviewed as Ken's record."

In his review for JazzTimes Duck Baker states "There are moments of subtle understatement as well as bursting intensity, and it all flows along with the collective intent that characterizes free music (or any kind of jazz) when it's really happening."

Track listing
All compositions by Morris/Vandermark/Poppel
 "Photon"  – 1:20
 "New Fire" – 3:06
 "Within Reach" – 5:27 
 "Like Rays" – 7:56
 "So as to Touch"  – 7:32
 "Life Stuff" – 5:44
 "Parlance" – 4:54
 "I Can Live with That"  – 6:22
 "Hand Signals" – 7:39
 "From Dreams" – 8:54
 "Levitate" – 2:05

Personnel
Joe Morris - electric guitar
Ken Vandermark – clarinet, bass clarinet
Hans Poppel – piano

References

1998 albums
Joe Morris (guitarist) albums
Ken Vandermark albums
Knitting Factory Records albums